The Rellim Farm near Kearneysville, West Virginia is a  farm and orchard complex which was once part of the nearby Traveller's Rest property.  The upper Shenandoah Valley region supports a significant fruit industry, and Rellim Farm is a representative example of this form of agriculture, the oldest family-owned operation in Jefferson County.  Beginning in the 1930s, Paul Miller Sr. began to work with the nearby West Virginia University Experimental Farm in the development of spray technology, which was applied throughout the industry.

"Rellim" is derived from "Miller" spelled backwards.

References

Houses on the National Register of Historic Places in West Virginia
Houses in Jefferson County, West Virginia
Houses completed in 1905
Farms on the National Register of Historic Places in West Virginia
National Register of Historic Places in Jefferson County, West Virginia
Historic districts in Jefferson County, West Virginia
Historic districts on the National Register of Historic Places in West Virginia
1905 establishments in West Virginia